The 1998–99 NBA season was the Bucks' 31st season in the National Basketball Association. On March 23, 1998, the owners of all 29 NBA teams voted 27–2 to reopen the league's collective bargaining agreement, seeking changes to the league's salary cap system, and a ceiling on individual player salaries. The National Basketball Players Association (NBPA) opposed to the owners' plan, and wanted raises for players who earned the league's minimum salary. After both sides failed to reach an agreement, the owners called for a lockout, which began on July 1, 1998, putting a hold on all team trades, free agent signings and training camp workouts, and cancelling many NBA regular season and preseason games. Due to the lockout, the NBA All-Star Game, which was scheduled to be played in Philadelphia on February 14, 1999, was also cancelled. However, on January 6, 1999, NBA commissioner David Stern, and NBPA director Billy Hunter finally reached an agreement to end the lockout. The deal was approved by both the players and owners, and was signed on January 20, ending the lockout after 204 days. The regular season began on February 5, and was cut short to just 50 games instead of the regular 82-game schedule.

The Bucks selected German basketball star Dirk Nowitzki with the ninth pick in the 1998 NBA draft, but soon traded him to the Dallas Mavericks in exchange for top draft pick Robert Traylor. The team also hired head coach George Karl, who previously coached the Seattle SuperSonics, and signed free agents, three-point specialist Dell Curry, and Vinny Del Negro. The Bucks transition continued at midseason trading Terrell Brandon to the Minnesota Timberwolves, and acquiring Sam Cassell and Chris Gatling from the New Jersey Nets in exchange for Elliot Perry in a three-team trade. However, Cassell only played just four games with the team due to an ankle injury. In another trade, they dealt Tyrone Hill and second-year forward Jerald Honeycutt to the Philadelphia 76ers in exchange for second-year forward Tim Thomas and Scott Williams, while signing free agent Haywoode Workman. Under Karl, the Bucks won five of their first six games, and played above .500 for the entire season as they finally entered the playoffs after a seven-year playoff drought, finishing fourth in the Central Division with a 28–22 record.

Glenn Robinson averaged 18.4 points and 5.9 rebounds per game, while Ray Allen averaged 17.1 points per game, and Curry provided the team with 10.1 points per game off the bench, while shooting .476 in three-point field goal percentage. In addition, Armen Gilliam contributed 8.3 points and 3.7 rebounds per game off the bench, while Workman provided with 6.9 points and 5.9 assists per game, Del Negro contributed 5.9 points and 3.6 assists per game also off the bench, Traylor was the team's starting center, averaging 5.3 points and 3.7 rebounds per game, and Ervin Johnson averaged 5.1 points and 6.4 rebounds per game off the bench.

However, in the Eastern Conference First Round of the playoffs, the Bucks would be swept by the Indiana Pacers in three straight games. Following the season, Curry signed as a free agent with the Toronto Raptors, while Gatling and Gilliam were both traded to the Orlando Magic, and Michael Curry re-signed with the Detroit Pistons.

Draft picks

Roster

Roster Notes
 Shooting guard Jerome Allen was signed by the Bucks near the end of the season, but did not play for them.

Regular season

Season standings

z - clinched division title
y - clinched division title
x - clinched playoff spot

Record vs. opponents

Game log

Playoffs

|- align="center" bgcolor="#ffcccc"
| 1
| May 9
| @ Indiana
| L 88–110
| Ray Allen (24)
| Glenn Robinson (7)
| three players tied (3)
| Market Square Arena16,560
| 0–1
|- align="center" bgcolor="#ffcccc"
| 2
| May 11
| @ Indiana
| L 107–108 (OT)
| Ray Allen (25)
| Glenn Robinson (12)
| Sam Cassell (11)
| Market Square Arena16,608
| 0–2
|- align="center" bgcolor="#ffcccc"
| 3
| May 13
| Indiana
| L 91–99
| Glenn Robinson (23)
| Ray Allen (11)
| Sam Cassell (12)
| Bradley Center18,717
| 0–3
|-

Player statistics

Season

Playoffs

Awards and records

Transactions

Trades

Free agents

Player Transactions Citation:

References

See also
 1998-99 NBA season

Milwaukee Bucks seasons
Milwaukee Bucks
Milwaukee Bucks
Milwaukee